Carlos de la Garza is an American Grammy Award-winning mixer, record producer, engineer, musician, and songwriter based in Los Angeles.

Early life 
De la Garza was born and raised in Cerritos, California. He started playing drums in high school and played in various local bands. While still in high school, he simultaneously joined Long Beach ska-punk band Suburban Rhythm and punk band F.Y.P, and later became a member of Reel Big Fish.

Music production and engineering 
De la Garza has worked with artists and bands such as The Linda Lindas, Paramore, M83, Young the Giant, Jimmy Eat World, Teenage Wrist, Tegan and Sara, Wolf Alice, Cherry Glazerr, Best Coast, Hunny, Wild Belle, Charly Bliss, Bad Religion, Ray Barbee, Fitz and the Tantrums, Third Eye Blind, Bleached, and Ziggy Marley, whose self-titled album mixed and engineered by de la Garza won a Grammy Award in 2016. Paramore's Self-titled album, which de la Garza engineered and performed on, also won a Grammy award for "Best Rock Song" in 2015. In 2018 Wolf Alice was awarded the Mercury Prize for their album "Visions of A Life", which de la Garza also engineered.

In addition to his production and engineering work, de la Garza is an accomplished musician and multi-instrumentalist, being highly proficient in drums and percussion, guitar, bass, and keyboards. 
de la Garza was also a member of punk band F.Y.P. from 1991-1993 and popular ska punk band Reel Big Fish, in which he played drums from 1999-2003.

Two of de la Garza's daughters, Lucia and Mila, are members of the punk rock band The Linda Lindas.

Discography

Awards

|-
|2019
|"Rebellion Rises" (as Engineer)
| Grammy Award: Best Reggae Album
| 
|-
|2018
|"Visions of a Life" (as Engineer)
| Mercury Prize
| 
|-
|2017
|"Ziggy Marley" (as Mixer & Engineer)
| Grammy Award: Best Reggae Album
| 
|-
|2015
|"Ain't It Fun" (as Engineer, mixing engineer, vocal producer, percussion)
| Grammy Award: Rock Song Of The Year
|

References

External links
Management website

Year of birth missing (living people)
Living people
American drummers
American male songwriters
Hispanic and Latino American musicians
American record producers